"Money" is a song by the English progressive rock band Pink Floyd from their 1973 album The Dark Side of the Moon. Written by Roger Waters, it opened side two of the original album.

Released as a single, it became the band's first hit in the United States, reaching number 10 in Cash Box magazine and number 13 on the Billboard Hot 100. 

Distinctive elements of the song include its unusual – time signature, and the tape loop of money-related sound effects (such as a ringing cash register and a jingle of coins) that is heard periodically throughout the song, including on its own at the beginning.

Composition

"Money" has been described as a progressive rock, blues rock, and hard rock song.

The song changes to  time for an extended guitar solo. The first of three choruses which comprise the solo was recorded using real-time double tracking. Gilmour played the chorus nearly identically in two passes recorded to two different tracks of a multi-track tape machine. The second chorus is a single guitar. The doubled effect for the third chorus was created using automatic (or "artificial") double-tracking (ADT).

Gilmour was, said mix supervisor Chris Thomas, "inclined to record his guitar tracks with the effects already there, from his amp. So his sound was pretty big anyway, and he would always want to go for that. On 'Money', I remember I got him to double-track the descending riff at the end of the solo section – to make that bigger and make a difference before it goes back to sounding quite small for the last verse. I always thought that part of the guitar riff didn't sound big enough; it had to be really big."

One of Gilmour's ideas for the solo section was that, for the second chorus of the solo, all reverb and echo effects would be completely off (referred to as "dry"), creating the sense of just four musicians playing in a small room. For this "dry" chorus, all musicians played softly and subtly, with Gilmour's solo, now one single guitar, playing very sparsely. Then, for the third chorus, the dynamics would suddenly rise, with heavy use of reverb and echo (a "wet" sound), additional rhythm-guitar parts in the background, and the drums becoming heavy and almost chaotic.

The form and chord progression are based on the standard twelve-bar blues in the key of B minor, with the vocal melody and nearly all of Gilmour's soloing based on the pentatonic and blues scales. Two twelve-bar verses are followed by a twenty-bar instrumental section that features a blues-style tenor saxophone solo (played by Dick Parry) along with keyboard, bass and drums and a further two-bar intro in  leading to the guitar solo, which is structured like a twelve-bar blues, but doubled to a twenty-four-bar length.

"Money interested me enormously," Waters remarked on the twentieth anniversary of Dark Side. "I remember thinking, 'Well, this is it and I have to decide whether I'm really a socialist or not.' I'm still keen on a general welfare society, but I became a capitalist. You have to accept it. I remember coveting a Bentley like crazy. The only way to get something like that was through rock or the football pools. I very much wanted all that material stuff."

Recording

The demo tracks for the song, including some of the sound effects, were recorded in a makeshift recording studio Roger Waters had in his garden shed. As recorded by the band, the song has a "bluesy, transatlantic feel", unlike Waters' original demo version, which he later described as "prissy and very English". As heard on Classic Albums: Pink Floyd – The Making of The Dark Side of the Moon, the demo is in the key of G-sharp minor, as opposed to the B minor of the final version.

The instrumental jam was a collaborative effort, with Gilmour overseeing the time change as well as his own guitar and vocal work, and Richard Wright and Nick Mason improvising their own parts. Dick Parry contributed the tenor saxophone solo that precedes the guitar solo. Gilmour's input is also discernible in the final mix, which features contrasting "wet" sections, with thick reverb and delay effects, and "dry" sections. In particular, during the second chorus of the guitar solo, all the reverb and delay effects are suddenly pulled out, creating a much smaller and more intimate virtual space. To produce the distinctive piercing high notes that distinguish the final chorus of his solo, Gilmour played a customised Lewis guitar with twenty-four frets, allowing a full four-octave range.

One of the most distinctive elements of "Money" is the rhythmic sequence of sound effects that begins the track and is heard throughout the first several bars. This was created by splicing together recordings Waters had made of clinking coins, a ringing cash register, tearing paper, a clicking counting machine and other items to construct a seven-beat effects loop. The original loop was used for early live performances, but had to be re-recorded onto multi track tape for the album. It was later adapted to four tracks in order to create a "walk around the room" effect in the quadraphonic mix of The Dark Side of the Moon.

In the documentary Classic Albums: Pink Floyd – The Making of The Dark Side of the Moon, engineer Alan Parsons described the recording of the band's initial backing track for the song: they used the sound-effect tape loop as a sort of metronome, but Parsons gradually faded out the loop before the vocals started. As the song progressed, the band gradually sped up, yet later, between the second verse and the saxophone solo, Parsons briefly raised up the volume of the effects loop, and just by coincidence, it turned out to fit the beat. After this point, the loop is not heard again.

Re-recording
The song was re-recorded for the 1981 Pink Floyd album, A Collection of Great Dance Songs, because Capitol Records refused to license the track to Columbia Records in the United States.

With the help of co-producer James Guthrie, David Gilmour re-recorded the song, providing the vocals and playing all the instruments except saxophone, where Parry reprised his role on the original recording. This re-recorded version lasts 15 seconds longer than the original album edition.

Four different quadraphonic versions of the song were also released on Quadrafile, a demonstration record released in 1976. These represent the only Pink Floyd material released in QS, CD-4 and UD-4 quadraphonic formats. Atom Heart Mother, The Dark Side of the Moon and Wish You Were Here were released in the more successful SQ format.

Live
From 1972 to 1975, "Money" was a regular feature of the band's Dark Side of the Moon set, and it was routinely performed as an encore during the band's 1977 tour. These later performances would typically last as long as twelve minutes. From 1987 to 1990, the band performed the song during tours supporting A Momentary Lapse of Reason, their first album without Waters, who had left the band in December 1985. In 1994 the band performed the song during tours supporting The Division Bell, their second album without Waters. An extended version of the song, again lasting up to twelve minutes, was regularly performed during Gilmour's 1984 US tour in support of his solo album About Face.

Waters has also regularly included it on his solo tours. For his tour supporting The Pros and Cons of Hitch Hiking, he sang the lead vocals himself. For his Radio K.A.O.S. tour, guest vocalist and keyboardist Paul Carrack sung the lead. For the American part of his In the Flesh tour, it was sung by Doyle Bramhall II, while for the European part it was sung by Chester Kamen. For The Dark Side of the Moon Live, it was sung by Dave Kilminster. "Money" was also performed by Waters at Live Earth's Concert at Giants Stadium on 7 July 2007.

"Money" was performed during Pink Floyd's reunion show, for which Waters rejoined the band (after more than two decades), at the Live 8 concert in London in 2005, along with "Breathe" (including the reprise that follows "Time"), "Wish You Were Here" and "Comfortably Numb". Unusually for a live Pink Floyd performance, at Live 8 the band kept the song's solo to three choruses, as it is on the album.

Gilmour played the song regularly during his Rattle That Lock Tour in 2015 and 2016.

Reception
Pink Floyd's album The Dark Side of the Moon was released 1 March 1973. "Money" is the only song from The Dark Side of the Moon to make its appearance on the Billboard Top 100 list of 1973, where it was ranked 92. In 2008, Guitar World magazine listed David Gilmour's solo on "Money" as No. 62 among readers' votes for "The Greatest 100 Guitar Solos." The song was also ranked No. 69 on the list of "The 100 Greatest Guitar Songs of All Time" of Rolling Stone. This song avoids more typical Pink Floyd themes such as paranoia, insanity, the meaning of life, and the passage of time. Instead, the lyrics criticise crass materialism.

Video
The music video for "Money" features scenes of various ways of making and spending money, and includes brief close-ups of a coin spinning, coins flowing in a mint, gold ingots in a bank, and a record copy of The Dark Side of the Moon on a turntable. In addition, the video also includes shots of the album making its way down a conveyor belt in a factory/distribution plant as well as shots of gramophone records and audio equipment being destroyed by explosives during the song's bridge.

Personnel
Pink Floyd 
David Gilmour – lead vocals, electric guitars
Roger Waters – bass guitar, tape effects
Richard Wright – Wurlitzer electronic piano
Nick Mason – drums, tape effects

Session musician
Dick Parry – tenor saxophone

Production
Pink Floyd – producers
Alan Parsons – engineering
Peter James – assistant (incorrectly identified as "Peter Jones" on first US pressings of the LP)
Chris Thomas – mix supervisor

1981 re-recording personnel
David Gilmour – vocals, guitars, Wurlitzer electric piano, bass guitar, drums 
Dick Parry – tenor saxophone

Production:
David Gilmour – producer
James Guthrie – engineer

Chart history

Weekly charts

Year-end charts

Certifications

References

External links

[ AMG review]

British hard rock songs
Pink Floyd songs
1973 singles
Songs written by Roger Waters
Song recordings produced by David Gilmour
Song recordings produced by Roger Waters
Song recordings produced by Richard Wright (musician)
Song recordings produced by Nick Mason
Harvest Records singles
Songs about consumerism
Songs about poverty
Songs against capitalism